The Shire of Dumbleyung is a local government area in the Wheatbelt region of Western Australia, about  east of Wagin and about  southeast of Perth, the state capital. Its seat of government is the town of Dumbleyung.

History
On 1 October 1909, the Dumbleyung Road District was created. On 1 July 1961, it became a Shire following the enactment of the Local Government Act 1960.

Wards

The President and Elected Members are elected by the local community to represent the interests and needs of the community. Council is currently made up of seven (7) Councillors representing the whole of the Shire of Dumbleyung district.

As of 3 May 2003, the shire was divided into 4 wards.

 Dumbleyung Ward (3 councillors)
 North Ward (3 councillors)
 Kukerin (1 councillor)
 South Ward (2 councillors)

Previously, there were 5 wards: Central (Dumbleyung), North (Dongolocking), South (Datatine), Merilup and Kukerin.

Towns and localities
The towns and localities of the Shire of Dumbleyung with population and size figures based on the most recent Australian census:

Population

Heritage-listed places
As of 2023, 57 places are heritage-listed in the Shire of Dumbleyung, of which none are on the State Register of Heritage Places.

References

External links
 

Dumbleyung